Mai Minna Villadsen (born 26 December 1991) is a Danish politician who is a member of the Folketing and the political spokesperson of the Red–Green Alliance. Villadsen has been a member of the Folketing since the 2019 Danish general election.

Early life
Villadsen grew up in the town of Kibæk, which is one of the places in Denmark where the Red–Green Alliance has the lowest voter turnout. She is the daughter of primary school teachers Jørn Sloth Andersen and Lisbeth Ejby Villadsen. As inspiration to enter politics, Villadsen has mentioned her grandmother, who was a seamstress and active in trade union life.

Villadsen attended Kibæk School from 1997 until 2007 and became a student at Gefion Gymnasium in 2011, but without subsequently completing a higher education.

From 2013 until 2015, Villadsen was employed as a youth consultant in the trade union HK Denmark, where she worked with organising young people in the professional community and advised members in connection with dismissals.

From 2015 until 2019, she was a political adviser in the Red–Green Alliance. Around the same time, she worked as an external lecturer at think tank CEVEA, and in the period 2015 until 2017 as an external project manager and lecturer at DeltagerDanmark. The work consisted, among other things, of training young professional activists in debate and organisation.

Political career
Villadsen was elected into parliament at the 2019 election, where she received 2,572 votes. On 10 February 2021, she became the new political spokesperson for the Red–Green Alliance, after Pernille Skipper. Despite the Red-Green Alliance losing four seats at the 2022 Danish general election, Villadsen was re-elected receiving 10,822 personal votes.

References

External links 
 Biography on the website of the Danish Parliament (Folketinget)

Living people
1991 births
People from Herning Municipality
Red–Green Alliance (Denmark) politicians
Women members of the Folketing
21st-century Danish women politicians
Members of the Folketing 2019–2022
Members of the Folketing 2022–2026
Leaders of political parties in Denmark